Metachroma interruptum is a species of leaf beetle. It is found in the United States, where its range spans from Texas to Florida and Indiana to Utah. Its length is between 4.4 and 6.0 mm.

References

Further reading

 
 
 
 

Eumolpinae
Beetles described in 1824
Taxa named by Thomas Say
Beetles of the United States